The Gimpo Line is a former freight railway line operated by Korean National Railroad that served Gimpo International Airport, southwest of Seoul. The line was a 9.2 km spur line that terminated near the airport and connected to the Gyeongin Line (Seoul Subway Line 1) at Bucheon Station. The line was opened on August 20, 1951 mainly to transport US military materiel, fuel and munitions and closed on August 10, 1980 due to competition by road freight transport.

Stations 
Bucheon - Yakdae - Gimpo (not to be confused with Gimpo International Airport Station)

See also
 Transportation in South Korea

References

Railway lines in South Korea
Closed railway lines
Railway lines opened in 1951
Railway lines closed in 1980